Arditi (from the Italian verb ardire, lit. "to dare", and translates as "The Daring [Ones]") was the name adopted by a Royal Italian Army elite special force of World War I. They and the opposing German Stormtroopers were the first modern shock troops, and they have been defined "the most feared corps by opposing armies".

Reparti d'assalto (Assault Units) were formed in the summer of 1917 by Colonel Bassi, and were assigned the tactical role of shock troops, breaching enemy defenses in order to prepare the way for a broad infantry advance. The Arditi were not units within infantry divisions, but were considered a separate combat arm.

The Reparti d'assalto were successful in bringing in a degree of movement to what had previously been a war of entrenched positions. They won numerous engagements armed mainly with daggers and hand grenades, which proved very effective in the confined space of a trench. Their exploits on the battlefield were exemplary and they gained an illustrious place in Italian military history. They were demobilized by 1920.

The name Arditi was later used in 1919–20 by the Italian occupiers of Fiume who were led by Gabriele D'Annunzio, most of whom had been members of the Royal Italian Army. Their use of a uniform with black shirts and black fez was later taken up by Benito Mussolini's paramilitary forces, the Blackshirts.

From 1 October 1975 the flag of X Arditi Regiment (formed in 1942 in imitation of the IX Assault unit of the First World War) was adopted by the 9th Paratroopers Assault Regiment "Col Moschin". To this day, operatives of Col Moschin and Italian commando frogmen are known as "Arditi Incursori" and are viewed as the heirs of the Arditi of World War I.

World War I

Early experiments

The ardito concept can be traced back to 1914 when every regiment of the Royal Army was ordered to create a group of explorers trained to act behind enemy lines. The first Arditi units were formed and trained in Sdricca di Manzano, in the province of Udine, where the event is still celebrated  on the last Sunday in July.

Others argue that the so-called Compagnie della morte ("Companies of death"), special patrols of infantry and engineers engaged in cutting or blasting enemy barbed wire, should be considered as precursors of the Arditi. They were easily recognizable by their use of armor and "Farina" helmets.

The task of Arditi units was not to clear the way for regular infantry to attack enemy lines, but to completely overrun enemy positions. The most daring volunteers were chosen, particularly those who were not bothered by loud incoming artillery fire close by. The men also studied fencing and were masters of hand-to-hand combat. Once ready, they were sent to the front armed with light assault weapons such as carbines, pistols, daggers and hand grenades. Many did not carry rifles and carbines because they would be cumbersome to fire in the confined spaces of a trench. The Arditi approached enemy trenches while they were being shelled by Italian artillery. Just as the barrage was lifted they would jump inside the trench while the enemy was huddling down, and use their daggers at close quarters to suppress enemy resistance. These primitive tactics were surprisingly effective. Arditi had to hold the positions they conquered for 24 hours and then would be replaced by the regular infantry. Arditi might lose 25% to 30% of their numbers during such an attack.  Their motto was O la vittoria, o tutti accoppati meaning "Either victory, or everyone dies". The typical unit had 13 officers and 400 soldiers  selected on a voluntary basis. One such unit was completely wiped out while attacking Monte Osvaldo in April 1916.

In 1916 the supreme command decided to award special status to Arditi units but was reluctant to create new units. The Arditi badge, to be carried on the left arm, included the monogram VE (for Victor Emmanuel III of Italy), and was designed exclusively as a symbol of distinction for these soldiers. This was the first official use of the word "Ardito" by the Italian army.

Establishment and use
In 1917 as a result of proposals put forward by young officers who were tired of the gruesome bloodshed of trench life, assault units were formed within the 48th Division of the VIII Army Corps, commanded by Captain Giuseppe Bassi. As early as March 1917 the Italian Supreme Command had sent a circular communication giving information about the constitution of Austro-Hungarian special units.

Following a positive evaluation it was decided to establish the new special units, but disagreements on equipment and  training delayed the start of operations until July 29, 1917, when King Victor  Emmanuel officially sanctioned the creation of Arditi units.

The new assault units were formed and then developed independently with training different from that of ordinary soldiers. The better trained German army was the first to adopt the concept of shock assault troops with the Stormtroopers, but the Italians followed their example. A training school was established, as noted above, at Sdricca di Manzano, in Friuli. The first units were created in the 2nd Army, and by the time of Caporetto there were 27 units, although only a few actually saw combat. In all, approximately 18,000 men made up the Arditi units. Many of these men saw combat on the river Piave, where the advance of Austro-Hungarian troops was halted. Arditi used to swim across the Piave, clenching a dagger between their teeth and assault the Austrian and German positions on the other bank of the river Piave. These men came to be known as Caimani del Piave ("the Caimans of the Piave"). Because Austrian uniforms had a stiff collar, the "Caimani" preferred to use a resolza knife, typical of Sardinia (Pattada), as this blade could easily penetrate the collar of the enemy uniform (other arditi formations used a simple dagger). Today, the badge worn by COMSUBIN commandoes shows a caiman clenching a dagger in its jaws. This is an emblem chosen to honor the memory of the Caimani del Piave.

In June 1918 an entire division of assault troops with nine units was placed under the command of Major General Ottavio Zoppi, and then was expanded to become an Army Corps with twelve units in two divisions. By the end of the war there were 25 assault units, mostly classified as Bersaglieri.

The Arditi contributed in a major way to the breakthrough on the Piave that in November 1918 made possible the final victory over Austrian armies.

Shortly after the end of the war, in January 1920, all units were disbanded.

Training
Initially the soldiers were volunteers, but later on unit commanders designated suitable soldiers for transfer to Arditi units. Arditi were usually drawn from Bersaglieri or Alpini (two Italian military specialties whose soldiers were renowned for their stamina and physical prowess). After undergoing tests of strength, skill and nerve, the recruits were trained in the use of weapons and innovative tactics of attack. They also received hand-to-hand fighting instruction with or without weapons (according to the "Flower of Battle" techniques developed in the Middle Ages), all supported by continuous physical training.

In particular, Arditi were trained with hand grenades, marksmanship and the use of the flamethrower and machine gun. Training was very realistic, and several men were killed during basic training: in particular, victims were caused by splinters from hand grenades, because their operating procedure provided for a direct assault immediately after throwing a grenade. The rigorous training, team spirit and contempt of danger, but also the privileges they enjoyed, made the Arditi an elite corps, but also created a climate of distrust and jealousy with officers belonging to other units of the regular army. Their military skill, however, earned them respect for the ability to resolve on the battlefield situations tactically impossible for regular army units.

While teaching at Naples Eastern University in 1917, Japanese writer Harukichi Shimoi enlisted in the Italian army and became an Ardito, teaching his fellow soldiers some karate.

Reginaldo Giuliani, a Catholic priest and an Ardito, wrote several books on his experiences including Croce e spada ("Cross and Sword").

Uniform

The uniform of the Arditi drawn from regular infantry units consisted of a Bersagliere cyclist coat with black flames as a lapel patch. Arditi drawn from Alpini units would instead wear green flames on their lapel patch, and Arditi drawn from Bersaglieri units would wear crimson flames. They would also wear a dark green sweater and a black fez (a hat) identical to that of the Bersaglieri infantry (although Bersaglieri wore a crimson fez, rather than a black one) and trousers. From these uniforms and other insignia, indicative of the army unit of origin, was born a distinction between the Red Flames (Bersaglieri Arditi), Black Flames (Arditi Infantry) and Green Flames (Arditi Alpini). The Red Flames were sometimes called Crimson Flames.

Many of the Arditi badges and symbols were later adopted by the fascist regime, for example a badge depicting a skull with a dagger clenched between the teeth. The anti-fascist Arditi del Popolo also had their own badge (skull with red eyes and dagger). Their battle cry was A Noi! ('to us'), which was later adopted as one of the phrases commonly used when making the Roman salute and originated as a duelling challenge during the Renaissance.

Equipment
Typical equipment of the Arditi was the dagger for hand-to-hand combat, and hand grenades. The grenades were used to create panic and confusion as well as for their disruptive effect. The Thevenot hand grenade frequently used by the Arditi was well suited for assaults, not being overly powerful, but very noisy so as to provoke fear in the opponents. Other weapons included machine guns and flame throwers. The carbines used by the Arditi were the Carcano Moschetto 91 and Moschetto 91 TS. The Arditi also used 37 mm and 65 mm cannons against pillboxes and fortifications.

In the Museo del Risorgimento in Turin, the hall is dedicated to the resistance against Fascism. There are on display a dagger and a hand grenade belonging to the Arditi del Popolo. Due to lack of resources the first daggers were manufactured from surplus stock of the bayonets from the Vetterli rifle. Each bayonet was cut in half and fashioned into two daggers.

Under fascism

In the post-World War I period, many Arditi joined the 'National Association Arditi d'Italia' (ANAI), founded by captain Mario Carli, then involved in the Futurist movement in art. Carli wrote the essay "Arditi are not gendarmes" in collaboration with Filippo Tommaso Marinetti.

A large number of Arditi joined the fascist movement, but support was not unanimous, as is clear from the Arditi del Popolo, a fringe breakaway movement of the ANAI, politically leaning to the maximalist wing of socialism. In any case, most Arditi  who joined the ANAI transferred their allegiance to the FNAI (National Federation Arditi D'Italia), founded on 23 October 1922 by Mussolini. The ANAI was later dissolved.

The Arditi were active participants in Gabriele D'Annunzio's coup in the city of Fiume (now Rijeka, in Croatia). When his original plan for Italian annexation was rebuffed by the government in Rome, D'Annunzio proclaimed the founding of the "Italian Regency of Carnaro". With the trade unionist De Ambris, D'Annunzio promulgated a constitution, the Charter of Carnaro, containing strongly progressive or even radical elements. On December 25, 1920,   regular Italian army troops put an end to the short-lived "regency," after brief clashes.

The Arditi del Popolo

The Roman section of the Italian Arditi, in contrast to the strong but not yet consolidated movement of fascist squadrismo, became the Arditi del Popolo, a paramilitary group that was clearly anti-fascist. Its members came from anarchist, communist, and socialist movements. The Communists constituted the majority, but there were also components such as Republican Vincenzo Baldazzi (who was one of the leaders), and sometimes, as in the defense of Parma, also militants of the (Catholic) Popular Party, such as the adviser Corazza who was killed in Parma in clashes with fascist forces. The movement was born in the summer of 1921 through the work of Argo Secondari, a former lieutenant of the "Black Flame" infantry and an anarchist. The strength of these paramilitary formations were 20,000 men enrolled, among them war veterans, who were neutral or strongly anti-fascist.

Perhaps the most resonant event was the defense of Parma against fascist squadrismo in 1922: around 10,000 squadristi, first under the command of Roberto Farinacci, then Italo Balbo, had to withdraw from the city after five days of clashes against a group consisting of socialists, anarchists and communists, controlled by the heads of the Arditi del Popolo (350 took part in the battle against the fascists) Antonio Cieri and Guido Picelli. The Fascist lost 39 men, the Arditi del Popolo five.

In the following months, many heads of the Arditi del Popolo were jailed or killed by fascist squadristi, sometimes with the collusion of police agencies.

See also 
Arditi del Popolo, an antifascist organization created in 1921 by anarchist Argo Secondari
The Milizia Volontaria per la Sicurezza Nazionale (National Security Volunteer Militia) of the Italian Fascist movement
Stormtroopers (Imperial Germany)

Notes

Sources 
  (account of the book in Socialist Worker review)

Italian language

External links

Arditi in English
 Salvante, Martina: Arditi, in: 1914-1918-online. International Encyclopedia of the First World War.
The Flower of Battle
A Dagger used by Arditi
Italian Army resurrects the battle proven Arditi Dagger
 COMSUBIN page showing their patch with the Caiman clenching the dagger
Arditi del Popolo PDF
Approfondimento/2
Arditi at Barricateaparma.it
Arditi at Cimeetrincee.it
Arditi Dagger (ru)
Origin of the Arditi at Ardito2000.it

Military units and formations of Italy in World War I
Special forces of Italy
Combat occupations